The Aldan Highlands, or Aldan Plateau are a mountainous area in the Sakha Republic, Far Eastern Federal District, Russia. Aldan town and Tommot are located in the northern area of the highlands and Chulman in the south.

The Olyokma Nature Reserve is a protected area located on the northwestern side, partly within the neighboring Lena Plateau.

History
The area of the Aldan and the Yudoma-Maya highlands, between the basins of the Aldan River and the Yudoma, was uncharted territory well until the 1930s. It was first surveyed in 1934 by geologist Yuri Bilibin (1901—1952) together with mining engineer Evgeny Bobin (1897—1941) in the course of an expedition sent by the government of the USSR. Bilibin and Bobin made a thorough topographic survey of the mountainous region leading separate research parties.

Geography
The Aldan Highlands are located at the southern end of the Sakha Republic, between the Aldan River and the Uchur River, a right tributary of the Aldan. The Aldan partly crosses the uplands in the north, in the same manner as the Amga River in the west. The highlands are limited by the Stanovoy Range to the southwest, and by its Toko-Stanovik subrange to the south and southeast. In the west the Olyokma River marks the limit, beyond which lies the Olyokma-Chara Plateau. The Dzhugdzhur Range rises to the east of the highlands.

Subranges
The system of the Aldan Highlands comprises a number of subranges where mountains are generally of middle height and their relief usually smooth. The highest point is an unnamed  summit. The ranges within the uplands include the following:

Western Yangi Range, highest point Mount Evota  
Sunnagyn Range (Aldan-Uchur), highest point 
Ket-Kap Range, highest point 
Tommot Range, highest point

Hydrography
Besides the Aldan and the Amga, the rivers of the highlands include the Buotama, the Amedichi, the Elkon, the Ulu, the Bolshoy Nimnyr, the Yungyuele, the Timpton and the Tuolba.

Geology
The highlands are composed of Archean crystalline slates and gneisses. The Aldan Highlands coincide geographically with the Aldan Shield, a geological region that is an exposed part of the Siberian Craton. Together with the Anabar Shield further to the northwest, the Aldan Shield is one of the main features of the craton.

Flora
The mountains of the highlands are covered by larch taiga up to elevations between 1,100 and 1,300 m and by rocky tundra at higher altitudes.

See also
List of mountains and hills of Russia

References

External links
Rare birds of the Aldan highlands (South Yakutia)